This article lists the largest hourglasses that have been built.

Footnotes

Hourglasses
Individual clocks